Lee Jong-won is a Korean name consisting of the family name Lee and the given name Jong-won. It may refer to:

 Lee Jong-won (born 1969), a South Korean actor
 Lee Jong-won (volleyball) (born 1952), a South Korean volleyball player
 Lee Jong-won (footballer) (born 1989), a South Korean football player
 Lee Jong-won (actor, born 1994)